The Roman Catholic Diocese of Saint Cloud is a Roman Catholic diocese in Minnesota, United States.  This diocese covers Benton, Douglas, Grant, Isanti, Kanabec, Mille Lacs, Morrison, Otter Tail, Pope, Sherburne, Stearns, Stevens, Todd, Traverse, Wadena, and Wilkin counties. It is a suffragan see of the Archdiocese of Saint Paul and Minneapolis. Its See city is Saint Cloud.  The cathedral parish is the Cathedral of St. Mary. On September 20, 2013, Pope Francis named Donald Joseph Kettler bishop.

History

On February 12, 1875 Pope Pius IX established the Vicariate Apostolic of Northern Minnesota.  The territory, which had been part of the Diocese of Saint Paul, was evangelized by the missionary priest Father Francis Xavier Pierz.  It lost territory when the Diocese of Duluth was established in 1889.  

On September 22 of the same year the vicariate was elevated by Pope Leo XIII to the Roman Catholic Diocese of Saint Cloud.

The patron saint of the Diocese is Clodoald (Saint Cloud), a Merovingian prince who renounced his claims to the throne of the Franks, in favor of religious life. The diocese is named for the City of Saint Cloud, which was named after a French city named for Clodoald.

Sex abuse cases and bankruptcy
Between April and October of 2016, the Diocese turned over 13,500 documents to law enforcement related to allegations of sex abuse by priests of parishioners during previous decades. The Diocese announced on February 28, 2018 that it would file for bankruptcy amid lawsuits by survivors alleging sexual abuse by its priests and staff. 

On March 5, 2018, the Diocese of St. Cloud became the fourth diocese in Minnesota to declare bankruptcy after passage of the Minnesota Child Victims Act of 2013. It had lifted the previous civil statute of limitations for child abuse sexual allegations until 2016. On August 22, 2018, Joe Towalski, Diocese director of communications, announced that the Diocese of Saint Cloud would cooperate with a proposed grand jury investigation to disclose names of accused priests. 

On May 26, 2020, the court agreed that the Diocese could undergo bankruptcy if it forfeited $22.5 million to compensate 70 sex abuse survivors. The same day, St. Cloud Bishop Donald Joseph Kettler issued an apology to the sex abuse survivors for the harm they suffered. He said that he remained committed to "assist in the healing of all those who have been hurt."

Leadership

Vicar Apostolic of Northern Minnesota
 Rupert Seidenbusch, O.S.B. (1875–1888)

Bishops of Saint Cloud
 John Joseph Frederick Otto Zardetti (1889–1894), appointed Archbishop of Bucharest
 Martin Marty, O.S.B. (1895–1896)
 James Trobec (1897–1914)
 Joseph Francis Busch (1915–1953)
 Peter William Bartholome (1953–1968)
 George Henry Speltz (1968–1987)
 Jerome George Hanus, O.S.B. (1987–1994), appointed Coadjutor Archbishop and later Archbishop of Dubuque
 John Francis Kinney (1995–2013)
 Donald Joseph Kettler (2013 – 2022)
 Patrick Neary, C.S.C. (2023 - present)

Coadjutor bishops
Peter William Bartholome (1941–1953)
George Henry Speltz (1966–1968)

Auxiliary bishop
 James Steven Rausch (1973–1977), appointed Bishop of Phoenix

Other priests of this diocese who became bishops
Henry Joseph Soenneker, Bishop of Owensboro (1961–1982)
Harold Joseph Dimmerling, Bishop of Rapid City (1969–1987)

High schools
Cathedral High School, St. Cloud, Minnesota
Saint John's Preparatory School, Collegeville

See also

 Catholic Church by country
 Catholic Church in the United States
 Ecclesiastical Province of Saint Paul and Minneapolis
 Global organisation of the Catholic Church
 List of Roman Catholic archdioceses (by country and continent)
 List of Roman Catholic dioceses (alphabetical) (including archdioceses)
 List of Roman Catholic dioceses (structured view) (including archdioceses)
 List of the Catholic dioceses of the United States

References

External links
Roman Catholic Diocese of Saint Cloud Official Site

 
Saint Cloud
Diocese of Saint Cloud
Religious organizations established in 1889
Saint Cloud
Saint Cloud
1889 establishments in Minnesota